Prince Edward—Lennox was a federal electoral district represented in the House of Commons of Canada from 1925 to 1968. It was located in the province of Ontario. This riding was created in 1924 from Prince Edward riding and parts of Lennox and Addington riding.

It initially consisted of the county of Prince Edward and the townships of Adolphustown, Amherst Island, Fredericksburg (North and South) and Richmond in the county of Lennox and Addington.

In 1933, the township of Ernestown in the county of Lennox and Addington was added to the riding.

The electoral district was abolished in 1966 when it was redistributed between Prince Edward—Hastings, Kingston and the Islands and Frontenac—Lennox and Addington ridings.

Members of Parliament

This riding elected the following members of the House of Commons of Canada:

Election results

|- 
  
|Conservative
|John Hubbs 
|align="right"|6,435    

|}

|- 
  
|Conservative
|John Hubbs 
|align="right"| 7,139    
  
|Liberal
|Henry Herbert Horsey 
|align="right"| 6,199   
|}

|- 
  
|Conservative
|John Aaron Weese
|align="right"| 6,923    
  
|Liberal
|William Henry Benson
|align="right"| 5,447   
|}

|- 
  
|Conservative
|George Tustin
|align="right"| 7,411    
  
|Liberal
|James Warren Clark
|align="right"|  6,771   

|}

|- 

|National Government
|George Tustin
|align="right"| 6,574    
  
|Liberal
|Howard Weese  
|align="right"|5,906   
|}

|- 
  
|Progressive Conservative
|George Tustin 
|align="right"|7,907    
  
|Liberal
|Gordon L. Bell
|align="right"|5,121   
 
|Co-operative Commonwealth
|Donald Wesley East
|align="right"|517   
|}

|- 
  
|Progressive Conservative
|George Tustin 
|align="right"|7,435    
  
|Liberal
|Gordon Bell 
|align="right"| 5,965   
 
|Co-operative Commonwealth
|Colin Carter
|align="right"| 866   
|}

|- 
  
|Progressive Conservative
|George Tustin 
|align="right"|  6,726    
 
|Independent
|David Donald Thompson 
|align="right"|5,801   
|}

|- 
  
|Progressive Conservative
|Clarence Milligan
|align="right"|9,003    
  
|Liberal
|Clinton Green
|align="right"| 5,901   
|}

|- 
  
|Progressive Conservative
|Clarence Milligan 
|align="right"|  10,783    
  
|Liberal
|Fred Norman 
|align="right"|4,458   
|}

|- 
  
|Progressive Conservative
|Douglas Alkenbrack  
|align="right"| 9,094    
  
|Liberal
|Lloyd Woolsey 
|align="right"|7,128   
 
|New Democratic
|Howard Weese
|align="right"|  922    

|}

|- 
  
|Progressive Conservative
|Douglas Alkenbrack
|align="right"| 8,869    
  
|Liberal
|Lloyd Douglas Woolsey
|align="right"| 7,515   
 
|New Democratic
|Howard Weese 
|align="right"|  863    

|}

|- 
  
|Progressive Conservative
|Douglas Alkenbrack
|align="right"|9,064    
  
|Liberal
|Lloyd D. Woolsey 
|align="right"| 6,311   
 
|New Democratic
|Jack Owen 
|align="right"| 1,043    
|}

See also 

 List of Canadian federal electoral districts
 Past Canadian electoral districts

External links 

 Website of the Parliament of Canada

Former federal electoral districts of Ontario